The Hart Memorial Trophy, originally known as the Hart Trophy, is an annual award for the most valuable player in the National Hockey League (NHL), voted by the members of the Professional Hockey Writers' Association. The original trophy was donated to the league in 1923 by David Hart, the father of Cecil Hart, the longtime head coach of the Montreal Canadiens. The Hart Trophy has been awarded 98 times to 61 different players since its beginnings in 1923–24.

History

The Hart Memorial Trophy is named in honour of Canadian Dr. David Hart. Dr. Hart, who donated the original trophy to the NHL, was the father of Cecil Hart, a former Coach and General Manager of the Montreal Canadiens. The trophy was first awarded at the conclusion of the 1923–24 NHL season to Frank Nighbor of the original Ottawa Senators. The original Hart Trophy was retired to the Hockey Hall of Fame in 1960, and the NHL began presenting a new trophy, which was dubbed the Hart Memorial Trophy in its place. With the exceptions of Tommy Anderson, Al Rollins, and Jose Theodore, every eligible player who won the Hart Trophy (and retired) has been inducted into the Hall of Fame.

Wayne Gretzky won the award a record nine times during his career, eight consecutively. He has been named MVP more times than any player in the history of the other three North American major professional leagues (Major League Baseball (MLB), National Basketball Association, and National Football League). Barry Bonds is second, having won the MVP award seven times in the National League of Major League Baseball (The American League also awards an MVP), although until the 1930s baseball players were only permitted to win the award one time which limited the number of times Babe Ruth could win. Kareem Abdul-Jabbar won the NBA MVP award six times, and before Gretzky, Gordie Howe held the record for the NHL having won the Hart 6 times.  Gretzky and his Edmonton Oilers teammate Mark Messier are the only players to win the Hart Trophy with more than one team. Michael Jordan won the NBA MVP award 5 times. Peyton Manning won the NFL MVP 5 times. Only 5 players have won as many as 3: Jim Brown, Johnny Unitas, Brett Favre, Tom Brady, Aaron Rodgers. 

Players from the Montreal Canadiens have won the award seventeen times; players from the Boston Bruins are second with thirteen winners. Joe Thornton became the only Hart Trophy winner to have switched clubs during his winning campaign during the 2005–06 season, having played for both the Bruins and San Jose Sharks that year. The defenseman with the most trophy victories is Eddie Shore, who has four. By contrast, it is rare for a goaltender to win the award, which has happened only eight times in its history by 7 different goaltenders; Buffalo Sabres goaltender Dominik Hasek is the only two-time winner.

The voting is conducted at the end of the regular season by members of the Professional Hockey Writers' Association, and each individual voter ranks their top five candidates on a 10-7-5-3-1 point(s) system. Three finalists are named and the trophy is awarded at the NHL Awards ceremony after the playoffs. The closest the voting for the Hart Trophy has ever come was in the 2001–02 season, when Jose Theodore and Jarome Iginla tied in the total voting. The tiebreaker for choosing the Hart Trophy winner in such a case is number of first-place votes: Theodore claimed it, who had 86 first-place votes to Iginla's 82.

In 2008, the NHL's official online shop came under criticism after they placed a T-shirt advertising Alexander Ovechkin as the award winner on sale a week before the results were revealed. A spokesperson for the league said "in an effort to offer our fans the merchandise they want in a timely manner following an event such as the NHL Awards, our licensees prepare product for all possible outcomes. In this situation, the link for one of the possible products became live early through an error by our e-commerce provider." Ovechkin was later confirmed to be the winner.

Winners

Multi-time winners

Teams

See also
Ted Lindsay Award
List of NHL statistical leaders

Notes

References

General
  
 
 
 

Specific

Awards established in 1924
Canada
National Hockey League trophies and awards
Most valuable player awards